Tredington is a village and civil parish on the River Stour in Warwickshire, England. The civil parish includes the village of Newbold on Stour and hamlets of Armscote, Blackwell and Darlingscott. The 2011 Census recorded the parish population as 1,422. Tredington civil parish was part of Worcestershire until 1931. The River Stour runs through Tredington, and it was here that Geoff Crabtree caught the second largest pike ever to have been netted in the United Kingdom, weighing in at 45 lb 7oz (20.6 kg), as reported in the July 2007 edition of Angler's Mail.

History

Parish church
The oldest parts of the Church of England parish church of St Gregory are Anglo-Danish, built around 1000. The building has subsequent phases of work from the 12th, 14th, 15th and 17th or 18th centuries. The building was restored in the 19th century. The west tower is 14th-century and has a tall spire. The church is a Grade I listed building. The west tower has a ring of six bells. George Purdue of Taunton, Somerset cast the third, fourth and tenor bells in 1622. Robert Atton of Buckingham cast the fifth bell in 1624. Matthew I Bagley of Chacombe, Northamptonshire cast the treble bell in 1683. G Mears and Company of the Whitechapel Bell Foundry in London cast the second bell in 1858.

Quaker arrest
In the years after the Restoration, Nonconformist religious groups were suppressed, including Quakers. Quaker leader George Fox was arrested on a visit to Tredington in 1673.

Amenities
Tredington had an 18th-century pub, the White Lion. that was closed 2019, until It was open again in 2022 after it had a major renovation. Newbold on Stour and Tredington primary school is in Tredington. Tredington no longer has a village shop or filling station. Tredington previously had a Little Chef restaurant, until this was taken over by Channings Diner (circa 1997).

References

Bibliography

External links

Tredington Parish Council

Civil parishes in Warwickshire
Villages in Warwickshire